Winter holiday may refer to:

 Christmas and holiday season
 Winter holiday, a name sometimes given to the Christmas period to avoid Christian connotations (see Christmas controversy)
 Winter Holiday (novel), a book in the Swallows and Amazons series by Arthur Ransome
 Winter Holidays (Vacanze d'inverno), a 1959 Italian film

See also 
 Holiday
 List of winter festivals